Matyáš Démar (born 1 October 1991) is a Czech volleyball player for Nantes Rezé Métropole Volley and the Czech national team.

He participated at the 2017 Men's European Volleyball Championship.

References

1991 births
Living people
Czech men's volleyball players
Czech expatriate sportspeople in France
Expatriate volleyball players in France